Dan K. Morhaim (born December 1948), an American politician and physician, was a member of the Maryland House of Delegates representing northwest Baltimore County from 1995 to 2019. He sponsored legislation concerning healthcare, the environment, and streamlining government operations. He is also an author of books and has written articles for medical publications and the general media.

Background
Born in Los Angeles, California, United States, in December 1948, Morhaim graduated from Fairfax High School in Los Angeles and earned a Bachelor of Arts in history from the University of California, Berkeley in 1970. Morhaim received his Doctor of Medicine from New York Medical College in 1975 and is board certified in internal and emergency medicine.

Career
Morhaim was first elected to the Maryland House of Delegates in 1994 and was re-elected in 1998, 2002, 2006, 2010, and 2014. In 2017, the House and Senate reprimanded Morhaim for paid consulting work performed for a company seeking a medical cannabis license. He chose not to run for re-election in 2018.

In the legislature, Morhaim served on numerous committees including Environmental Matters Committee, 1995-2003; Health and Government Operations Committee, 2003-17; Judiciary Committee, 2017-19; Joint Committee on Administrative, Executive and Legislative Review, 2003-19; Joint Committee on Health Care Delivery and Financing, 2007-14; Joint Information Technology and Biotechnology Committee, 2009-14; Joint Committee on Transparency and Open Government, 2011-14; Joint Committee on Cybersecurity, Information Technology, and Biotechnology, 2014-19; Joint Committee on Legislative Information Technology and Open Government, 2015-19; Joint Committee on Behavioral Health and Opioid Use Disorders, 2015-19. Morhaim sponsored numerous bills focusing on health care, environment, and procurement reform.

He served as co-chair of the Alliance for Patient Access, a bi-partisan national organization of physicians elected to state office and as co-chair of the Innovations in Health Care Task Force for the National Conference of State Legislators (NCSL).

Dr. Morhaim is board certified in Internal Medicine and Emergency Medicine, and he has over 40 years front-line clinical experience. From 1981 to 1994, he chaired the Department of emergency medicine at Franklin Square Hospital (Baltimore) while building a 90-doctor 120-employee group at 6 Maryland hospitals. He is on staff at Sinai and Northwest Hospitals, part of the Lifebridge Health System. Other clinical experiences include: the State of Maryland's medical mission to Kuwait following the first Gulf War, the Indian Health Service (Navajo area), Health Care for the Homeless (Baltimore), medical director for local ambulance companies, and medical director for the 1993 Major League Baseball All-Star Game at Orioles Park.

Dr. Morhaim was Faculty at the Johns Hopkins Bloomberg School of Public Health for 16 years, where he taught graduate students, did public health research, and wrote articles for both peer-reviewed and general media publications. His book “The Better End: Surviving (and Dying) on Your Own Terms in Today’s Modern Medical World” (Johns Hopkins Press, www.thebetterend.com) is endorsed by Maya Angelou, Dr. Ben Carson, Hopkins Dean Dr. Michael Klag, and others.

Dan has served on the Boards of several organizations, including University of Maryland Biotech Institute (UMBI), Western Indemnity Insurance Company, Maritime Medical Systems, Brick Mental Health Foundation, Unified Community Connections (formerly United Cerebral Palsy), Baltimore Humane Society, Health Care for the Homeless, the State's Task Force on Recycling, Region III medical director for the State Emergency Medical System, and on the Executive Committees at Franklin Square and Sinai Hospitals.

He has been recognized for his medical, academic, and legislative work by numerous organizations, including receiving the AMA's prestigious Nathan Davis Award for Public Service in 2011 and awards from Maryland nurses, physicians, architects, retailers, minority business groups, and many others.

Dan Morhaim has published numerous articles, both medical and non-medical, and he is a frequent guest on radio and TV.

In 2018, Morhaim announced, after 24 years of service in the Maryland General Assembly, that he would not seek re-election.
In 2019, he was selected as Chair of the Baltimore County Behavioral Healthcare Council, which helps people with substance abuse and/or mental health problems

Dan is married to Shelley Cole Morhaim (writer, film producer, and Chair of the Maryland State Arts Council), and they have three adult children and two grandchildren.

Legislative notes
List of key votes on legislation introduced by Morhaim as the primary or co-sponsor:
 2016 Increases Renewable Energy Portfolio Standards of 2016 (HB1106)
 2016 Prohibits Firearms on Campus of 2016 (HB1002)
 2016 Requires Employers to Offer Paid Sick Leave of 2016 (HB580)
 2015 Authorizes Expungement of Certain Crimes (HB124)
 2013 Authorizes Medical Marijuana (HB1101)
 2013 Amends the State Health Benefits Exchange and Medicaid Program (HB228)
 2012 Establishes State Health Insurance Exchanges (HB443)
 2011 Prohibiting Sexual Orientation and Gender Identity Discrimination (HB235)
 2009 Proof of Citizenship Requirement for ID Cards, Vehicle Licenses, and Permits (HB387)
 2008 Increasing Renewable Energy Standards (HB374)
 2008 Energy Efficiency Regulations (HB374)
 2007 Chesapeake and Atlantic Coastal Bays Green Fund (HB1220)
 2007 Tobacco Tax to Fund Health Care (HB754)
 2007 Indoor Smoking Ban (HB359)
 2007 Maryland Clean Cars Act of 2007 (HB131)
 2006 Mandatory Sentences and Other Penalties for Sex Offenders (HB2)
 2006 Restrictions on Campaign Fund-Raising Activities by Members of the Board of Regents (HB1674)
 2006 Maryland Stem Cell Research Act of 2006 (HB1)

Notes

References

External links
 
 The Better End book website

University of California, Berkeley alumni
Politicians from Los Angeles
Democratic Party members of the Maryland House of Delegates
1948 births
Living people
New York Medical College alumni
Johns Hopkins University faculty
University of Maryland, Baltimore faculty
Physicians from Maryland
21st-century American politicians